House of Councillors elections were held in Japan on 24 April 1953, electing half the seats in the House. The Yoshida faction of the Liberal Party won the most seats.

Results

By constituency

Aftermath
In the national constituency, a polling station in Sano, Tochigi accidentally had Japan Socialist Party candidate Takeshi Hirabayashi labelled as belonging to the Japanese Communist Party. As a result, the results in Sano were invalidated through an appeal decision of the Supreme Court on 24 September 1954. A re-vote was held on 17 October 1954 with proper labels, and Hirabayashi narrowly won a spot in the lower ranks of the national constituency results.

References

Japan
House of Councillors (Japan) elections
1953 elections in Japan
Japan
Election and referendum articles with incomplete results